Sugar Bowl Bakery is a bakery based in Hayward, California. It is one of the largest food production companies in the San Francisco Bay Area. The company was founded in 1984, when Vietnamese immigrant Andrew Ly and his four brothers bought a San Francisco donut shop. In addition to retail products, the company serves hotels, and Costco, and has an extensive production and distribution capacity in the Northern California region. The bakery has been praised by President Barack Obama as an example of a successful immigration story, saying "[This is] what America is about ... the place where you can reach for something better if you work hard."

References

External links

Official website
C-Span Video

Food and drink in the San Francisco Bay Area
Companies based in Hayward, California
American companies established in 1984
1984 establishments in California
Bakeries of California